Sunayana Ghosh is an Indian percussionist.  Her instrument of choice is the tabla', the Indian hand drums

Biography
Born in Kolkata, India, Sunayana Ghosh learned music from her mother, who is a vocalist and her tabla gurus such as Samar Mitra, Pandit Shankar Ghosh of Farukhabad gharana and his son Bickram Ghosh.

Beside being a tabla soloist and accompanist and sharing stage with some masters of Indian classical music, Sunayana Ghosh is familiar with Indian vocal music and kathak dance and holds a Master of Arts in Music.

As a female tabla player, she has performed in India as well as Europe, Armenia and Turkey. Her very recent performance was aired by UK Radio (Surtarang FM).

New York city-based Tom Tom drum magazine for female drummers reported her music activities in its 5th issue.

References

External links
Sunayana Ghosh website

"Sunayana Ghosh Profile" in Tom Tom Magazine

Tabla players
Indian percussionists
Hindustani instrumentalists
Indian drummers
Living people
Year of birth missing (living people)